Life Ki Toh Lag Gayi is a 2012 Indian dark comedy action film directed and produced by Rakesh Mehta, featuring Kay Kay Menon, Ranvir Shorey, Neha Bhasin and Manu Rishi in the lead roles. The film was released on 27 April 2012 in India.

Cast
 Kay Kay Menon as Salman 
 Ranvir Shorey as Amol Ganguly 
 Pradhuman Singh Mall as Ajoy Ghosh 
 Neha Bhasin as Dolly Saluja 
 Manu Rishi Chadha as A.C.P. Rajveer Singh Chautala 
 Sharat Saxena as Ramakant Shetty 
 Shakti Kapoor as Producer Khanna 
 Rukhsar Rehman as Salman's wife Zeenat 
 Kuldeep Sareen as Usman Bhai 
 Snehal Dabi as Kutty, Shetty's Henchman
 Jackie Shroff
 Neeraj Vora as P K Lamab 
 Rajesh Kamble
 Razak Khan as Prince Ratan Tanshukia 
 Tom Alter
 Asrani as Nagraj Negi 
 Taran Bajaj as Lovely 
 Tarun Bali as Transport Minister
Kishor Kadam as Bhosale "Assistant To ACP"

Release

Initially, the film was supposed to release on 20 April 2012 but due to some objections raised by the censor board CBFC over some dialogues, the release of the film had to be postponed by a week. After making the changes asked by the censor board, the film was released on 27 April 2012.

Reception
The film received negative reviews from critics.
Gaurav Malanii of The Times of India criticized the film saying that, "the plot is not just unconventional but also uninteresting. The multiple tracks do not add diverse perspectives but contribute towards the common mess." Shaikh Ayaz of Rediff gave the film a rating of 1 out of 5 saying that, "Lack of imagination and an oddball cast lets down Rakesh Mehta's Life Ki Toh Lag Gayi". Blessy Chettiar of DNA India gave the film a rating of 1 out of 5 and said that, "There’s no reason to go pay and watch them on the big screen. Life Ki Toh Lag Gayi is best avoided." Martin D'Souza of Glamsham gave the film a rating of 2.5 out of 5 and said that, "Casting has let the film down big time and that is very disappointing because this film had the potential to make an impact. " Shaheen Parkar of Mid-Day gave the film a rating of 1.5 out of 5 saying that, "The story meanders around their trials and tribulations with Manu Rishi providing the light moments with the rest doing their bits in a script that has nothing much to offer." Rohit Vats of News18 said that, "'Life Ki Toh Lag Gayi' is slow but that's not the prime concern. It doesn't convey anything which was expected from a film with four characters carrying four separate notions." The critic gave the film a rating of 1.5 out of 5 and concluded his review by saying that, "'Life Ki Toh Lag Gayi' lacks a well thought out treatment which allows good actors to come up with wayward acting." Taran Adarsh of Bollywood Hungama gave the film a rating of 1.5 out of 5 and said that, "LIFE KI TOH LAG GAYI has a fascinating concept, but the writing plays the spoilsport". Shubhra Gupta of The Indian Express gave the film a rating of 2.5 out of 5 and said that, "I went in expecting nothing, and I was rewarded by a film that surprised me despite some predictable patches, and kept me engaged."

Soundtrack

The soundtrack of Life Ki Toh Lag Gayi consists of 9 songs composed by Vinay Jaiswal and Pardeep Kotwal, the lyrics of which have been written by Vinay Jaiswal.

References

External links 

2010s Hindi-language films
Indian action comedy films
2012 action comedy films
2012 films